Ruslan Eldarovich Kazakov (born 6 February 1999) is a Russian football player.

Club career
He made his debut in the Russian Football National League for FC Zenit-2 Saint Petersburg on 17 July 2018 in a game against FC Tambov.

On 2 February 2019, he joined third-tier PFL club FC Leningradets Leningrad Oblast.

References

External links
 Profile by Russian Football National League

1999 births
Footballers from Saint Petersburg
Living people
Russian footballers
Russia youth international footballers
FC Zenit-2 Saint Petersburg players
Association football midfielders
FC Leningradets Leningrad Oblast players